RiverSource (RiverSource Life Insurance Company) is a US-based Investment management and life insurance firm which is a subsidiary of Ameriprise Financial, Inc.  RiverSource is made up of RiverSource Investments, RiverSource Annuities, and RiverSource Insurance and is based in Minneapolis.

RiverSource Funds include more than 60 retail mutual funds and more than 20 variable portfolio mutual funds sold in variable annuity and variable insurance products offered by RiverSource Annuities and RiverSource Insurance. RiverSource Funds are currently available to individual and institutional U.S. investors. The more than 60 retail mutual funds had approximately $60 billion in assets under management as of June 30, 2005.

History
The forerunner to RiverSource was established in 1894 as Investors Syndicate in Minneapolis, Minnesota.  The syndicate changed its name to Investors Diversified Services, Inc. (IDS) in 1950.

In 1984 American Express bought IDS and integrated it into its own financial services division.  In 2005, American Express spun off American Express Financial Advisors and it became an independent company named Ameriprise Financial.  The new company created the RiverSource brand name for certain products and product lines.

Products

Investments
RiverSource Investments provides mutual funds for individual investors and investment strategies for institutional investors.

William (Ted) Truscott, Ameriprise Financial chief investment officer and a former executive with Zurich Scudder Investments in Boston, joined what was then American Express Financial Advisors in 2001. He changed the structure of the mutual fund business by opening "boutique" offices in places such as Boston, Cambridge, Minneapolis and London, where portfolio managers hand-pick staff and develop their own investment strategies appropriate to the funds.

Data as of 9/30/2006 Morningstar Fund Family Snapshot

Insurance
RiverSource Insurance offers fixed and variable life insurance and disability insurance for individual investors.

Annuities
RiverSource Annuities offers variable and fixed annuities for individual investors.

References

External links

Financial services companies of the United States